Skyll inte på mig! (in English literally Don't Blame Me!) was a Swedish television comedy series starring Magnus Härenstam and Brasse Brännström, produced in 1977, and like Fleksnes fataliteter based on Galton and Simpson's scripts for the British series Hancock's Half Hour, translated and directed by Bo Hermansson.

Episodes
The episode titles are followed by those of the original Hancock episodes and the guest actors appearing.

1. "Lördagskvällen" (The Big Night)

2. "Borta bra men hemma bäst" (The Economy Drive)
 Bernt Andersson
 Ena Carlborg-Mannberg
 Niels Carno
 Bertil Edh
 Sten Engborg
 Gunilla Engström
 Irma Erixson
 Britta Johansson

3. "Nya grannar" (The Girl Next Door)

An elderly couple with two attractive young daughters move in next door to Magnus & Brasse. Magnus & Brasse challenge the daughters' boyfriends to a tennis match, with devastating results. Afterwards they find out that the girls soon are going to marry their boyfriends.

4. "Till havs" (The Cruise)

5. "Mästerfotografen" (The Photographer)

External links 
Skyll inte på mig!, IMDB entry

1978 Swedish television series debuts
1978 Swedish television series endings
Swedish television sitcoms
Sveriges Television comedy shows
1970s Swedish television series